The city of Faridabad has a number of education facilities.

Colleges

 Lingaya's University
 Manav Rachna University
 National Institute of Animal Welfare
 National Power Training Institute (NPTI)
 Rai Foundation Engineering College
 YMCA University of Science and Technology

Schools

 Carmel Convent School, Sector 7D, Faridabad	
 DAV Public School (Dayanand Anglo Vedic Public School), Ballabhgarh, Faridabad	
 DAV Public School (Dayanand Anglo Vedic Public School), Sector 49, Faridabad	
 DAV Public School, Sector 37, Faridabad	
 Delhi Public School, Sector 19, Faridabad	
 Eicher School, Sector 46, Faridabad	
 Faridabad Model School, Sector 31, Faridabad	
 Holy Child Public School. Sector 29, Faridabad		
 Modern Vidya Niketan	
 Ryan International School	
 SOS Hermann Gmeiner School, Sector 29, Faridabad	
 Vidya Sanskar - International School for Holistic Learning, Village Bhopani
 The Modern School, Faridabad. BPTP Parklands, Sector 85, Faridabad

See also 
 List of institutions of higher education in Haryana

External links 
 Top 10 Schools in Faridabad

References 

Faridabad
Faridabad
Education in Faridabad
Haryana-related lists